Nicolás Morgantini (born 11 September 1994) is an Argentine professional footballer who plays as a right-back for Platense, on loan from Lanús.

Club career
Morgantini got his senior career underway in 2013 with Platense. After being an unused substitute for the club's 6–1 defeat in the Copa Argentina to Estudiantes on 4 December, he made his professional bow in Primera B Metropolitana days later versus Deportivo Armenio. Morgantini scored his first senior goal against the same opponents in November 2014, netting the sole strike in the thirty-sixth minute away from home. He made seventy-one appearances across his first six seasons with Platense, the last concluded with promotion as champions to Primera B Nacional in 2017–18.

On 16 January 2020, Morgantini joined Lanús on a deal until the end of 2022. Due to lack of playing time, Morgantini returned to Platense in January 2022, on a loan deal for the rest of 2022.

International career
In 2015, Morgantini was selected to train with the Argentina U23s.

Career statistics
.

Honours
Platense
 Primera B Metropolitana: 2017–18

References

External links

1994 births
Living people
Place of birth missing (living people)
Argentine people of Italian descent
Argentine footballers
Association football defenders
Primera B Metropolitana players
Primera Nacional players
Club Atlético Platense footballers
Club Atlético Lanús footballers
People from San Isidro, Buenos Aires
Sportspeople from Buenos Aires Province